Šarūnas "Šaras" Jasikevičius (born 5 March 1976) is a Lithuanian professional basketball coach and former player. He currently serves as a head coach for FC Barcelona of the Liga ACB and the EuroLeague.

Often considered one of the best Lithuanian and European point guards ever, Jasikevičius was a two-time All-EuroLeague First Team selection, the EuroLeague Final Four MVP in 2005 and a four-time triple crown winner. He was named the 2005 Israeli Basketball Premier League MVP. Moreover, he is the only player in EuroLeague history to win the competition with three clubs. A former representative of the senior Lithuanian men's national team, he won the gold medal at 2003 EuroBasket, earning an All-EuroBasket Team selection and MVP honors in the process. He also won the bronze medal at the 2000 Summer Olympic Games, and the bronze medal at 2007 EuroBasket.

On 9 February 2015, Jasikevičius was named a EuroLeague Basketball Legend, as a reward for his stunning playing career. He was then honored with a ceremony on 12 February.

Early years
Jasikevičius was born into a family of sportsmen. His mother Rita, a famous Lithuanian handball player, won a silver medal with the Soviet Union women's national handball team during the 1975 World Women's Handball Championship. Following the success in the world championship, Rita was preparing for the 1976 Summer Olympics in Montreal. According to Rita: "Everything was calculated, planned: Olympic Games, then - the increase of family, one year break and then back to sports again. But everything happened differently" and she had to choose between her son and the Olympic Games. She decided to give birth to a child and give up the Olympic dream. Later on, the Soviet squad went on to win the Olympic gold medals in the Montreal Olympics and the national team's head coach shut the door for Rita Jasikevičienė to return into the national team in the future. However, Šarūnas's mother never regretted her decision. Šarūnas remembers that his mother constantly said: "My son will give me back the Olympics".

In his childhood Šarūnas was a very agile child. His mother remembers that quickly after learning to walk, Šarūnas immediately began to run leaned by 45 degrees. Rita: "He was running and running everywhere and I had to constantly chase him". The biggest penalty for Šarūnas was to sit. His younger brother Vytenis was slightly different though. He was slower, but both brothers were unable to live without the ball in their childhood.

Jasikevičius's father Linas always was a sports lover and along with him, he followed practically everything, together they cheered for USSR national teams or any athlete who had USSR written across his or her chest. Not surprisingly, his dad took him to the first basketball workout when he was 6 years old. His first coach was Feliksas Mitkevičius in Kaunas basketball school, who was strict and not once was chasing Šarūnas when he was trying to run away from the workouts. According to Mitkevičius, when Šarūnas was 12 years old, he was so sick of basketball that he wished to drop it. He visited his parents, outlined the situation and stated that it would be a huge loss to Lithuania. Following it, his dad had a strong conversation with Šarūnas and forbade to drop basketball, which he wished to replace with tennis. In Kaunas basketball school he met with the future NBA star Žydrūnas Ilgauskas with which he was meeting practically every day, at school, in the gym or elsewhere for the next eleven years. Tomas Masiulis was another notable player in his team. Jasikevičius remembers that at first he was seen as the guy who was "talented but lazy" as he was no devotee of the gym; all he did was joke around and try to work as little as possible. Consequently, once his dad stopped him from going on a trip to Minsk with the team, a trip of kind which happens only once a year, as his marks were disastrous and it was a punishment: "No school? So no basketball". Though, his parents were happy to see him venting his hyperactivity in basketball, and this made them urge him on towards the sport, as it also helped him avoid bad company in the area. They played in the gym, and also in the street using scrap metal instead of real baskets, and their favorite pastime was called minus, a kind of forerunner of little game that can be seen today during the NBA All-Star Game called "horse". It was far from ideal, but his parents preferred to see him play with the scrap metal hoops in front of their home rather than down at the pitch, where it would have taken him less than five minutes to pick a fight with the wrong person. His childhood dream was to become a Žalgiris player about which he was so crazy that he knew everything about every player, even the players’ shoe sizes. Following the Žalgiris' victory in 1986 Intercontinental Cup, he begged his father to take him to the airport to welcome home the players, where hundreds of people were waiting in the freezing cold. His father knew some of the players, and managed to get signed posters and photos that he used to decorate all the walls of his room.

Šarūnas started going to school in Jonas Jablonskis Middle School in 1982 and attended it till 1987. He had to take the bus to go to school even though the thermometer outside read minus twenty and he knew that the most important thing for his parents was that he spent as little time as possible with the toughest people of Partizanai Street. From 1987 to 1993, he was studying at Kaunas 4th Middle School. His first trip destination was Moscow, which he visited before the tournament. Jasikevičius's greatest youth memory in the city was the opening of the first McDonald's in Russia. He remembers that his classmates were listening with their mouths gaping when he was narrating about the French fries, bread rolls with minced beef and fizzy drinks. One of his childhood passions was history, especially about the Native Americans, as well as books about basketball as he was capable of reading a book of more than four hundred pages on basketball in two days. He was also curious about politics, especially when Perestroika began, because of which he was able to travel to Berlin with his father and brother, and was amazed by the visit to the Checkpoint Charlie Museum. His childhood favorite Lithuanian player was Arvydas Sabonis, which he admired more than other Lithuanian superstars, such as Rimas Kurtinaitis and Valdemaras Chomičius, due to his passing. However, his idol was Dražen Petrović, and he wished to be as good as him, watching matches of him over and over again, dozens of times, for hours and hours, and later started imitating him in workouts. After one of his trips, his dad came back with a videocassette recorder, using which he was able to record an NBA All-Star Game with Michael Jordan, Clyde Drexler, Larry Bird, Magic Johnson, David Robinson, and later to watch it for couple of years, more than hundred times. Jasikevičius also started to record games of Žalgiris and Petrović every time he was able to. Thanks to the video recorder, he discovered the existence of a no-look pass of Magic Johnson. For him, he was the NBA, not Michael Jordan. His unselfishness, imagination and the way he dribbled, passed between his opponent's legs bewitched Jasikevičius. Consequently, his favorite element of basketball quickly became assisting his teammates, and he was trying to do it like Petrović or Johnson.

Later he continued his studies in the United States. In 1993–94 he attended the Solanco High School in Quarryville, Pennsylvania. That year his team won 25 of 27 games and was one of the contenders for the State Championship final, however they lost their first playoffs game and finished the season early. Although, he was noticed by Billy Hahn, who was working as University of Maryland assistant coach and invited Jasikevičius to join them.

College career
Jasikevičius played NCAA Division I college basketball at the University of Maryland, with the Maryland Terrapins. He played as a wing, although he remade himself into a point guard in his pro career. He did not see much playing time in his first two years in college, with seniors Duane Simpkins, Johnny Rhodes, and Exree Hipp ahead of him at the wing positions. As a junior, he became a better passer and improved his defense. He averaged a shade under 13 points and 4 assists in his junior and senior years.

Professional career

Early career
Jasikevičius made his pro debut in the 1998–99 season, with the Lithuanian club Lietuvos rytas, of Vilnius. With Rytas, he averaged 18.0 points and 5.4 assists per game. In the following 1999–2000 season, Jasikevičius joined the Slovenian club Union Olimpija. With Union Olimpija, he won the Slovenian Cup. With Union Olimpija, he averaged 9.3 points and 3.4 assists per game.

Barcelona Bàsquet
Jasikevičius played the next three seasons with FC Barcelona, and won the EuroLeague with them in 2003. He started for the championship team, and averaged 13.4 points and 3.2 assists per game. He also led the team to two Spanish League titles, and two Spanish King's Cups.

Maccabi Tel Aviv

Jasikevičius joined Maccabi Tel Aviv in 2003, and helped them win two EuroLeague titles, two Israeli League crowns, and two Israeli Cups. He was named the 2005 Israeli Basketball Premier League MVP.

NBA
Jasikevičius signed with the Indiana Pacers in July 2005. The deal was worth $12 million over three years. He played in the NBA with the Pacers in 112 regular season games (16 starts), in one and a half seasons, averaging 7.3 points and 3.0 assists per game.

On 17 January 2007, Jasikevičius was traded to the Golden State Warriors, along with Stephen Jackson, Al Harrington, and Josh Powell, in exchange for Troy Murphy, Mike Dunleavy, Jr., Ike Diogu, and Keith McLeod. He did not become a part of the rotation in Golden State. He averaged 4.3 points and 2.3 assists per game, in 26 games (2 starts) played, in only 11.9 minutes per game. Jasikevičius was bought out by the Warriors on 20 September 2007.

Panathinaikos Athens
On 25 September 2007, Jasikevičius signed with Panathinaikos. The deal reportedly was worth €7 million euros net income over two years (7.7 million including his buyout). With Panathinaikos, he won the EuroLeague again in 2009. Jasikevičius became the only player in basketball history to win the EuroLeague with three different teams. He also won three Greek League titles and three Greek Cups with Panathinaikos. In 2009, he signed a contract extension worth € 3.5 million euros net income with Panathinaikos. He underwent a knee surgery that same year, and after 5 months of rehabilitation, he returned to the court with limited playing time.

Return to Rytas Vilnius
In November 2010, Jasikevičius signed a one-year contract with Lietuvos rytas of the Lithuanian Basketball League.

Fenerbahçe Istanbul
In January 2011, Fenerbahçe, bought-out Jasikevičius' contract with Lietuvos Rytas, and he signed a one-year contract with them.

Return to Panathinaikos Athens
In September 2011, Jasikevičius signed a new contract with Panathinaikos. At age 36, he was named the Greek Cup Final MVP, as he helped Panathinaikos to victory against Olympiacos, in a game that finished with a score of 71–70.

Return to Barcelona Bàsquet
Despite rumors that Jasikevičius would join Žalgiris, in July 2012, Jasikevičius signed with his former team, FC Barcelona. During the fifth Spanish Liga ACB finals game against Real Madrid, Jasikevičius scored 23 points, and dished out 2 assists, in 19 minutes of game action. However, it wasn't enough, as Real won the game 79 to 71.

On 1 July 2013, it was announced that Barcelona had parted ways with Jasikevičius.

Žalgiris
In September 2013, Jasikevičius returned home to Kaunas, signing with Žalgiris. On 30 September 2013, he debuted with Žalgiris, during a game against Unics Kazan, scoring 6 points and dishing out 4 assists. He retired after the season, and joined the Žalgiris coaching staff.

National team career

Lithuanian junior national team
Jasikevičius was a member of the junior national teams of Lithuania. With Lithuania's junior national teams, he won the gold medal at the 1994 FIBA Europe Under-18 Championship, and the gold medal at the 1996 FIBA Europe Under-20 Championship.

Lithuanian senior national team
Jasikevičius started his senior national team career in 1997, when he played for Lithuania's senior national team at the EuroBasket 1997. Jasikevičius was also a member of the senior Lithuanian national team that won the bronze medal at the 2000 Summer Olympics. He averaged 14.0 points and 5.1 assists, and scored a tournament-high 27 points, in a semifinals loss to the United States.

Jasikevičius also led Lithuania to the EuroBasket 2003 gold medal. He was named the tournament's MVP, after averaging 14.0 points and 8.2 assists per game.

Jasikevičius also helped Lithuania win the bronze medal at the EuroBasket 2007. He averaged 10.4 points and 5.6 assists per game, and scored a tournament-high 18 points against Turkey, on 3 September 2007.

As of 2012, he was the only Lithuanian basketball player to participate in the Summer Olympics four times in a row. He retired from the Lithuanian national team following the 2012 Summer Olympics. In his entire career as a senior Lithuania national basketball team member, he averaged 10 points, 2.3 rebounds, and 4.9 assists per game.

Coaching career
On 29 July 2014, Jasikevičius announced his retirement from playing basketball, and was appointed to an assistant coach position with Žalgiris. After the firing of head coach Gintaras Krapikas during the 2015–16 season, Jasikevičius became the team's interim head coach. On 13 January 2016, it was announced that he was appointed as their new head coach.

On 22 January 2016, he accomplished his first EuroLeague victory as a head coach, when Žalgiris shockingly crushed the previous season's runners-up, Olympiacos, by a score of 75–55, at Žalgiris Arena. On 26 October 2016, just before the first game versus his former long-time head coach Željko Obradović, Željko said: "I knew that he will be a good coach and in the future - one of the best in Europe". On 13 June 2017, he was named best coach of the 2016–17 LKL season. After the season, San Antonio Spurs and U.S. national team head coach Gregg Popovich invited him to join his coaching staff during the 2017 NBA Summer League. However, Jasikevičius declined, due to his already early planned summer. Jasikevičius also took third place in the voting for the 2017 Alexander Gomelsky EuroLeague Coach of the Year award.

In the 2017–18 EuroLeague season, Jasikevičius and his Žalgiris surprised by ending in the sixth place in the regular season. On 26 April 2018, Žalgiris qualified for the 2018 EuroLeague Final Four by beating Olympiacos in game 4 to clinch a 3–1 series win. It was achieved by having a second lowest budget in the whole league. During the semi-final, Žalgiris played Fenerbahçe Doğuş, unfortunately losing 76–67. Two days later they faced CSKA Moscow in the bronze medal game, winning that game 77–79 and finishing third in the season. On 20 June 2018, he was named best coach of the 2017–18 LKL season after coaching Žalgiris to yet another Lithuanian League title. On 27 June, Jasikevičius signed one-season contract with Žalgiris. He was named as a LKL Coach of the Year for the third straight time in 2019.

According to the Euroleague statistics, Jasikevičius team's defensive rating had 97,0 in the 2019/20 season. Offensive rating of Jasikevičius team was 100,7. The tight offensive system by Jasikevičius led to only 15,6 turnovers per game in his last season. Under Šarūnas Jasikevičius, Žalgiris was the third slowest team with 80 possessions per game. This can be explained by mentioning the depth of Jasikevičius playbook, who had more than 40 different plays prepared.

On 2 July 2020, Jasikevičius signed a two-year contract to be FC Barcelona head coach. During his first season as a head coach of the FC Barcelona, the club won the 2020–21 EuroLeague Regular Season.

Career statistics

EuroLeague

|-
| style="text-align:left;"| 1999–00
| style="text-align:left;"| Union Olimpija
| 22 || 22 || 33.2 || .490 || .491 || .759 || 2.9 || 4.9 || 1.5 || 0.0 || 13.6 || -
|-
| style="text-align:left;"| 2000–01
| style="text-align:left;"| FC Barcelona
| 9 || 8 || 28.2 || .398 || .327 || .900 || 2.3 || 5.6 || 1.0 || .1 || 14.0 || 14.1
|-
| style="text-align:left;"| 2001–02
| style="text-align:left;"| FC Barcelona
| 18 || 16 || 23.5 || .504 || .449 || .872 || 2.1 || 3.4 || .9 || .1 || 11.6 || 10.2
|-
| style="text-align:left;background:#AFE6BA;"| 2002–03†
| style="text-align:left;"| FC Barcelona
| 21 || 15 || 26.4 || .423 || .378 || style="background:#CFECEC;"|.959 || 1.8 || 3.2 || .7 || .0 || 13.4 || 10.8
|-
| style="text-align:left;background:#AFE6BA;"| 2003–04†
| style="text-align:left;"| Maccabi Elite Tel Aviv
| 21 || 20 || 29.7 || .477 || .448 || .925 || 1.6 || 4.8 || .7 || .0 || 16.0 || 16.3
|-
| style="text-align:left;background:#AFE6BA;"| 2004–05†
| style="text-align:left;"| Maccabi Elite Tel Aviv
| 24 || 23 || 31.7 || .431 || .399 || .941 || 2.7 || 5.3 || .9 || .1 || 15.7 || 16.6
|-
| style="text-align:left;"| 2007–08
| style="text-align:left;"| Panathinaikos
| 20 || 5 || 23.5 || .485 || .408 || style="background:#CFECEC;"|.938 || 1.6 || 2.9 || .7 || .0 || 13.2 || 12.9
|-
| style="text-align:left;background:#AFE6BA;"| 2008–09†
| style="text-align:left;"| Panathinaikos
| 22 || 4 || 20.1 || .450 || .389 || .886 || 1.5 || 3.0 || .6 || .1 || 9.6 || 8.1
|-
| style="text-align:left;"| 2009–10
| style="text-align:left;"| Panathinaikos
| 7 || 0 || 15.8 || .400 || .000 || .700 || 1.1 || 2.1 || .3 || .0 || 4.4 || 2.6
|-
| style="text-align:left;"| 2010–11
| style="text-align:left;"| Lietuvos rytas
| 6 || 0 || 19.4 || .437 || .375 || .909 || 1.3 || 4.3 || .2 || .0 || 7.3 || 7.0
|-
| style="text-align:left;"| 2010–11
| style="text-align:left;"| Fenerbahçe Ülker
| 6 || 1 || 15.4 || .407 || .375 || .800 || 1.0 || 1.5 || .2 || .0 || 4.8 || 1.5
|-
| style="text-align:left;"| 2011–12
| style="text-align:left;"| Panathinaikos
| 21 || 1 || 15.4 || .517 || .385 || .875 || 1.3 || 2.5 || .6 || .0 || 7.2 || 6.3
|-
| style="text-align:left;"| 2012–13
| style="text-align:left;"| FC Barcelona
| 31 || 3 || 14.6 || .450 || .340 || .933 || .8 || 2.0 || .3 || .1 || 4.9 || 4.4
|-
| style="text-align:left;"| 2013–14
| style="text-align:left;"| Žalgiris
| 20 || 1 || 16.8 || .409 || .404 || 1.000 || 1.1 || 3.1 || .4 || .1 || 6.7 || 5.3
|- class="sortbottom"
| style="text-align:center;" colspan="2"| Career
| 226 || 97 || 22.0 || .452 || .394 || .927 || 1.6 || 3.4 || .6 || .0 || 10.4 || 9.6

NBA

Regular season

|-
| align="left" | 2005–06
| align="left" | Indiana
| 75 || 15 || 20.8 || .396 || .364 || .910 || 2.0 || 3.0 || .5 || .1 || 7.3
|-
| align="left" | 2006–07
| align="left" | Indiana
| 37 || 1 || 17.9 || .412 || .372 || .922 || 1.3 || 3.0 || .4 || .0 || 7.4
|-
| align="left" | 2006–07
| align="left" | Golden State
| 26 || 2 || 11.9 || .366 || .273 || .871 || .8 || 2.3 || .5 || .0 || 4.3
|- class="sortbottom"
| style="text-align:center;" colspan="2"| Career
| 138 || 18 || 18.3 || .397 || .355 || .908 || 1.6 || 2.9 || .5 || .0 || 6.8

Playoffs

|-
| align="left" | 2006
| align="left" | Indiana
| 6 || 0 || 11.0 || .368 || .222 || .500 || 1.0 || 1.0 || .0 || .2 || 2.8
|-
| align="left" | 2007
| align="left" | Golden State
| 4 || 0 || 1.5 || .000 || .000 || .500 || .0 || .5 || .0 || .0 || .3
|- class="sortbottom"
| style="text-align:center;" colspan="2"| Career
| 10 || 0 || 7.2 || .350 || .222 || .500 || .6 || .8 || .0 || .1 || 1.8

Coaching record

EuroLeague

|- 
| align="left" rowspan=5|Žalgiris
| align="left"|2015–16
| 12 || 2 || 10 ||  || align="center"|Eliminated in Top 16 stage
|- 
| align="left"|2016–17
| 30 || 14 || 16 ||  || align="center"|Eliminated in regular season
|- 
| align="left"|2017–18
| 36 || 22 || 14 ||  || align="center"|Won in 3rd place game
|- 
| align="left"|2018–19
| 34 || 16 || 18 ||  || align="center"|Eliminated in quarterfinals
|-
| align="left"|2019–20
| 28 || 12 || 16 ||  || align="center"| Season stopped due to the Covid-19 Pandemic
|-
| align="left" rowspan=2|Barcelona
| align="left"|2020–21
| 40 || 28 || 12 ||  || align="center"|Lost in the final game
|-
| align="left"|2021–22
| 39 || 28 ||  11 ||  || align="center"|Won in 3rd place game
|-class="sortbottom"
| align="center" colspan=2|Career||219||122||97||||

Domestic Leagues
 
|-
| align="left" |BC Žalgiris
| align="left" |2016–17
|47||42||5||.8936 || align="center"| Won 2017 Lithuanian League Finals
|-
| align="left" |BC Žalgiris
| align="left" |2017–18
|46||41||5||.8913 || align="center"| Won 2018 Lithuanian League Finals 
|-
| align="left" |BC Žalgiris
| align="left" |2018–19
|44||40||4||.9091 || align="center"| Won 2019 Lithuanian League Finals
|-
| align="left" |BC Žalgiris
| align="left" |2019–20
|24||22||2||.9167 || align="center"| League cancelled due to the COVID-19 pandemic, but awarded the 2020 championship.
|-
| align="left" |FC Barcelona Bàsquet
| align="left" |2020–21
|44||38||6||.8636 || align="center"| Won 2021 Spanish League Finals
|-class="sortbottom"
| align="center" colspan=2|Career||205|||183|||22||.8927||

Personal life
In 2006, Jasikevičius became the first European player to have his own nominal basketball shoes manufactured by Adidas.

In 2006, Jasikevičius married Israeli model Linor Abargil, the winner of the Miss World 1998 beauty pageant (as Miss Israel). They divorced in 2008.

In 2009, he met Anna Douka, in an Athens bar. Currently, the pair have two children: a girl named Aila, who was born in 2010, and a boy named Lukas, who was born in 2012.

Šarunas' younger brother, Vytenis Jasikevičius, is also a professional basketball player.

In 2015, his biographical book Laimėti neužtenka (English: To win is not enough) was published in Italian, Greek and Lithuanian languages. An English version was also soon released. Later on, Spanish and Israeli publishing houses also showed interest.

On 21 July 2017, Jasikevičius married the mother of his two children, Anna Douka, after 8 years of relationship. The ceremony was held in Greece. Many famous basketball personalities attended the event, including Željko Obradović, Dimitris Itoudis, Mike Batiste, Paulius Jankūnas, Darius Songaila, and others.

Honors and awards

Club career
 Lietuvos Rytas (1998–99)
 Union Olimpija (1999–2000)
 Slovenian Cup: (2000)
 FC Barcelona (2000–03)
 EuroLeague Championship: (2003)
2×  Spanish Championship: (2001, 2003)
2×  Spanish Cup: (2001, 2003)
Triple Crown: (2003)
 Maccabi Tel Aviv (2003–05)
2×  EuroLeague Championship: (2004, 2005)
2×  Israeli Championship: (2004, 2005)
2×  Israeli Cup: (2004, 2005)
2× Triple Crown: (2004, 2005)
 Indiana Pacers (2005–07)
NBA Playoffs: (2005–06)
 Golden State Warriors (2007)
NBA Playoffs: (2006–07)
 Panathinaikos (2007–10)
 EuroLeague Championship: (2009)
3×  Greek Championship: (2008, 2009, 2010)
2×  Greek Cup: (2008, 2009)
Triple Crown: (2009)
 Lietuvos Rytas (2010)
 Fenerbahçe (2011)
 Turkish Championship: (2011)
 Turkish Cup: (2011)
 Panathinaikos (2011–12)
 Greek Cup: (2012)
 FC Barcelona (2012–2013)
 Spanish Cup: (2013)
 Žalgiris (2013–14)
 Lithuanian Championship: (2014)

Individual
 Spanish League Finals MVP: (2003)
 FIBA EuroBasket All-Tournament Team: (2003)
 FIBA EuroBasket MVP: (2003)
 Mr. Europa: (2003)
 2× All-EuroLeague Team: (2004, 2005)
 2× All-Europe Player of the Year: (2004, 2005)
 EuroLeague Final Four MVP: (2005)
 EuroLeague Finals Top Scorer: (2005)
 Israeli Super League MVP: (2005)
 50 Greatest EuroLeague Contributors: (2008)
 Greek League Best Five: (2009)
 EuroLeague 2000–10 All-Decade Team: (2010)
 Greek Cup MVP: (2012)
 EuroLeague Basketball Legend: (2015)

References

Bibliography

External links

 Šarūnas Jasikevičius at acb.com 
 Šarūnas Jasikevičius at archive.fiba..com
 Šarūnas Jasikevičius at euroleague.net (coach)
 Šarūnas Jasikevičius at euroleague.net (player)
 Šarūnas Jasikevičius at NBA.com 
 Šarūnas Jasikevičius at tblstat.net
 

1976 births
Living people
1998 FIBA World Championship players
Basketball players at the 2000 Summer Olympics
Basketball players at the 2004 Summer Olympics
Basketball players at the 2008 Summer Olympics
Basketball players at the 2012 Summer Olympics
BC Rytas players
BC Žalgiris coaches
BC Žalgiris players
Fenerbahçe men's basketball players
FIBA EuroBasket-winning players
FC Barcelona Bàsquet players
Golden State Warriors players
Goodwill Games medalists in basketball
Greek Basket League players
Indiana Pacers players
Israeli Basketball Premier League players
KK Olimpija players
Liga ACB players
Lithuanian basketball coaches
Lithuanian expatriate basketball people in Greece
Lithuanian expatriate basketball people in Spain
Lithuanian expatriate basketball people in Turkey
Lithuanian expatriate basketball people in the United States
Lithuanian expatriate basketball people in Israel
Lithuanian expatriate basketball people in Slovenia
Lithuanian Sportsperson of the Year winners
Maccabi Tel Aviv B.C. players
Maryland Terrapins men's basketball players
Medalists at the 2000 Summer Olympics
National Basketball Association players from Lithuania
Olympic basketball players of Lithuania
Olympic bronze medalists for Lithuania
Olympic medalists in basketball
Panathinaikos B.C. players
Point guards
Shooting guards
Basketball players from Kaunas
Undrafted National Basketball Association players
Competitors at the 1998 Goodwill Games